The 2009 NCAA Division I women's volleyball tournament began on December 3, 2009 with 64 teams and ended on December 19, when Penn State defeated Texas, 3-2, in the NCAA National Championship match. With the win, Penn State won its fourth overall title, and became the first team in the history of women's intercollegiate volleyball to win three straight national titles. Penn State also became the first team in NCAA history to have two straight undefeated seasons, as the 2009 squad went 38-0 for the second straight year, extending the ongoing NCAA record of consecutive matches won (102).

Penn State became only the third team in NCAA history to win the national championship after trailing 0-2 in sets. The last team to accomplish the feat was UCLA in 1991.

Penn State's senior class, led by Megan Hodge and Alisha Glass, had an overall record of 142-5 (.966 winning %), which is the best winning percentage in NCAA Division I history for classes that have won national titles. Penn State hit .381 for the season, the second-best Division I team hitting percentage mark in the rally scoring era. It only trails the mark of .390 set by the 2008 Penn State squad.

Texas's Destinee Hooker, the Most Outstanding Player of the 2009 Final Four, broke the record of kills in an NCAA championship match, as she had a career high 34 kills in the final.

Records

Gainesville Regional

Gainesville all-tournament team

Megan Hodge Penn State (MVP)

Kelly Murphy Florida

Callie Rivers Florida

Blair Brown Penn State

Darcy Dorton Penn State

Alisha Glass Penn State

Arielle Wilson Penn State

Stanford Regional

Stanford region all-tournament team

Kanani Danielson Hawaii (MVP)

Amber Kaufman Hawaii

Stephanie Ferrell Hawaii

Alex Hunt Michigan

Lexi Zimmerman Michigan

Alix Klineman Stanford

Cassidy Lichtman Stanford

Minneapolis Regional

Minneapolis region all-tournament team

Hailey Cowles Minnesota (MVP)

Mira Djuric Florida State

Rachael Morgan Florida State

Stephanie Neville Florida State

Taylor Carico Minnesota

Lauren Gibbemeyer Minnesota

Christine Tan Minnesota

Omaha Regional

Omaha region all-tournament team

Destinee Hooker Texas (MVP)

Rachael Hockaday Iowa State

Kayla Banwarth Nebraska

Lindsey Licht Nebraska

Ashley Engle Texas

Julianne Faucette Texas

Heather Kisner Texas

Final Four – St. Pete Times Forum, Tampa, Florida

See also
NCAA Women's Volleyball Championship
AVCA

References

External links
 2009 Championship information
 Women's Volleyball at ncaa.com

NCAA Women's Volleyball Championship
NCAA Women's Volleyball Championship
Volleyball in Florida
NCAA Division I women's volleyball tournament
NCAA Division I women's volleyball tournament
Sports competitions in Tampa, Florida